Kathleen Taylor (born 9 November 1984) is a South African field hockey player who competed in the 2008 Summer Olympics.

References

External links 
 

1984 births
Living people
South African people of British descent
South African female field hockey players
Olympic field hockey players of South Africa
Field hockey players at the 2008 Summer Olympics
Field hockey players at the 2012 Summer Olympics
Field hockey players at the 2006 Commonwealth Games
Commonwealth Games competitors for South Africa
Field hockey players at the 2014 Commonwealth Games